The symbol of medicine may refer to:
Emblems of the International Red Cross and Red Crescent Movement
Star of Life
Rod of Asclepius

See also
Caduceus, often mistakenly used as a symbol of medicine due to confusion with the Rod of Asclepius
Red Cross Youth Song